The 2016 Big Sky Conference football season is the 53rd season of college football play for the Big Sky Conference and is a part of the 2016 NCAA Division I FCS football season.

Previous season

Rankings

Players of the Week

Players of the Year

All-Conference Players

All-Americans

Academic All-Americans

National Award Winners

Attendance

2017 NFL Draft

Head coaches

Beau Baldwin, Eastern Washington
Bruce Barnum, Portland State
Jeff Choate, Montana State
Earnest Collins, Northern Colorado
Ron Gould, UC Davis
Jay Hill, Weber State
Mike Kramer, Idaho State

Bubba Schweigert, North Dakota
Jody Sears, Sacramento State
Jerome Souers, Northern Arizona
Bob Stitt, Montana
Tim Walsh, Cal Poly  
Demario Warren, Southern Utah

References